Scopalina is a genus of sponges belonging to the family Scopalinidae.

The genus has almost cosmopolitan distribution.

Species:

Scopalina agoga 
Scopalina australiensis 
Scopalina azurea

References

Heteroscleromorpha
Sponge genera